Václav Vacek (11 September 187718 January 1960) was a Czech writer, and a communist politician. He served as a Senator in the National Assembly of Czechoslovakia and after the Prague Uprising as the Mayor of Prague. He was also a founding member of the Communist Party of Czechoslovakia after the schism in Czechoslovak Social Democratic Workers' Party in 1921.

Legacy
The Prague Metro station Roztyly was named after him until the revolution in 1989.

References

External links
 Official website of City of Prague

1877 births
1960 deaths
People from Libochovice
Mayors of Prague
Communist Party of Czechoslovakia politicians
Charles University alumni
20th-century Czech writers
Czechoslovak writers